The name Haishen has been used to name four tropical cyclones in the northwestern Pacific Ocean. The name was contributed by China. Its name means "God of sea".

 Typhoon Haishen (2002) (T0225, 30W) – a Category 2 typhoon that did not affect land
 Tropical Storm Haishen (2008) (T0820, 25W) – a short lived tropical storm that formed off the Coast of Japan
 Tropical Storm Haishen (2015) (T1505, 05W) – churned in the open sea
 Typhoon Haishen (2020) (T2010, 11W, Kristine) – a Category 4 super typhoon that moved through the Ryukyu Islands of Japan, and later made landfall in Ulsan, South Korea, then in South Hamgyong Province, North Korea

Pacific typhoon set index articles